Russian gunboat Sivuch may refer to:

 , an Imperial Russian Navy gunboat launched in 1884 and scuttled in 1904
 , an Imperial Russian Navy gunboat launched in 1907 and sunk in 1915

Russian Navy ship names